Hawk and dove may refer to:

Hawks & Doves, a 1980 album by Neil Young
Hawk and Dove, a fictional superhero team that appears in DC Comics
War hawk, an advocate for controversial wars
Monetary hawk and dove
Hawk-Dove game, a game theoretical model of aggressive behavior
The Hawk and the Dove, a book by Nicholas Thompson